James Wofford was a state legislator in Arkansas. He represented Crittenden County in the Arkansas House of Representatives in 1877. He was one of eight African Americans elected to the Arkansas General Assembly in 1876.

See also
African-American officeholders during and following the Reconstruction era

References

Year of birth missing
Members of the Arkansas House of Representatives